Koblenz is a German city situated on the Rhine at its confluence with the Moselle.

Koblenz may also refer to:

Koblenz, Switzerland, a municipality in Canton Aargau at the confluence of the Rhine and Aar
Koblenz (region), a former administrative subdivision of the German state of Rhineland-Palatinate
Koblenz (Lohsa), a constituent part of the former municipality of Knappensee in Saxony, Germany
Koblenz Appliances, a brand of consumer white appliances

See also
SS Coblenz, original name of the steamship SS Cuba